Luke McNamee (April 4, 1871 – December 30, 1952) was a United States Navy Admiral, businessman, and the 10th and 12th Naval Governor of Guam. He served in the Navy for 42 years, during which time he held multiple commands. During the Spanish–American War, he earned the Navy Cross, and later the Legion of Honour. 

Earlier on his career, he served as governor, and expanded funding for fighting the infectious diseases running through the native population. He represented the U.S. Navy as a delegate to the Paris Peace Conference in 1919. He later became Director of the Office of Naval Intelligence. He was promoted to full admiral after being placed in charge of the Battle Fleet. After this command, he served as President of the Naval War College before retiring in 1934. After leaving the Navy, he became President and Chairman of the Mackay Radio and Telegraph Company, where he aggressively expanded telegraph and radio service overseas.

Naval career
McNamee had a 42-year career in the United States Navy. He was appointed to the United States Naval Academy from Kansas, graduating in 1892. He was commissioned as an ensign on July 1, 1894. He became a lieutenant junior grade on March 3, 1899 and a lieutenant on July 1, 1900. He served as executive officer of the  during the Spanish–American War. 

In 1901, he served aboard the battleship . While on the Sacramento, he commanded all Navy forces in the Gulf of Mexico, though this only consisted seven gunboats. 

After his promotion, he served as chief of staff to the commander of the United States Pacific Fleet, and then to Admiral William Sims, commander of United States Naval forces in Europe. In 1919, he was on the naval advisory board at the Paris Peace Conference.

He served as Director of the Office of Naval Intelligence. From 1924-26, McNamee was appointed Naval attaché to the Court of St. James's in the United Kingdom. During his time in London, he was promoted to rear admiral. In 1926, he commanded all the Destroyers in the Battle Fleet, before becoming director of fleet training. for the next four years. After being promoted to vice admiral, he returned to the Battle Fleet to command its Battleship force, doing so from 1931 to 1932. In 1933, he achieved full admiral and commanded the entire Battle Force. 

On June 3, 1933, he became President of the Naval War College. He left the post on May 29, 1934 after retiring from active duty. During his career, he was awarded the Navy Cross and the French Legion of Honour.

Governorship
McNamee twice served as acting Governor of Guam: first from November 2, 1905 to December 3, 1906, and again from October 3, 1907 to December 28, 1907. 

As governor, he urged the United States Secretary of the Navy to invest in the control of leprosy and other infectious diseases on the island, arguing that this would be in the best interest of Navy finances, as it would protect paid personnel's productivity and the native Chamorro population, a group the Navy thought could provide cheap labor.

Business career and later life
After leaving the Navy, McNamee became President of the Mackay Radio and Telegraph Company in 1934. He aggressively expanded the company by modernizing its overseas operations. He extended service on government and private vessels using the company's equipment as well. In 1940, he led negotiations with labor unions after they shut down company operations, and was able to reach an agreement. 

On May 19, 1950, he became chairman of the board of directors. He also oversaw the opening of the first direct telegraph line to Bermuda. In May 1951, he resigned his position as director of both Mackay and International Telephone and Telegraph.

After retiring, McNamee lived in New York City. In 1948, he succeeded Herbert Livingston Satterlee as chairman of the executive committee of the Marine Museum of the City of New York.

Awards 
 Navy Cross
 French Legion of Honour

Personal life
Luke McNamee was born to Michael and Anne Amelia ( Garvey) McNamee in Mount Hope, Wisconsin in 1871.

On October 22, 1903, at Saint Cecilia's Church in Boston, Massachusetts, McNamee married Dorothy Swinburne (born 1880, Erie County, Pennsylvania), the daughter of Admiral William T. Swinburne. The McNamees had no children.

For much of his life, he lived in Wisconsin, though he later moved to Jamestown, Rhode Island. He spent the last two years of his life as a patient of the Naval Station Newport Hospital in Newport, Rhode Island.

On December 30, 1952, McNamee died at Naval Station Newport Hospital at Newport, Rhode Island. McNamee is interred at Arlington National Cemetery in Arlington, Virginia. His widow, Dorothy, died on November 21, 1965 (aged 85) and was interred beside her husband in Arlington National Cemetery.

References

1871 births
1952 deaths
Governors of Guam
United States Navy admirals
Presidents of the Naval War College
American military personnel of the Spanish–American War
United States Navy personnel of World War I
Burials at Arlington National Cemetery
Recipients of the Legion of Honour
Recipients of the Navy Cross (United States)
Paris Peace Conference (1919–1920)
Businesspeople from Newport, Rhode Island
People from Mount Hope, Wisconsin
American radio executives
Radio pioneers
Directors of museums in the United States
United States Naval Academy alumni
Directors of the Office of Naval Intelligence
People from Jamestown, Rhode Island
Military personnel from Wisconsin